No One Writes to the Colonel is a 1999 Spanish-language film directed by Arturo Ripstein. It was an international co-production between France, Spain and Mexico. It is based on the eponymous novella by Colombian author and Nobel Prize winner Gabriel García Márquez.

Cast
 Fernando Luján - El coronel
 Marisa Paredes - Lola
 Salma Hayek - Julia
 Rafael Inclán - Padre Ángel
 Ernesto Yáñez - Don Sabas
 Daniel Giménez Cacho - Nogales
 Esteban Soberanes - Germán
 Patricia Reyes Spíndola - Jacinta
 Odiseo Bichir - Dr. Pardo
 Julián Pastor - Lugones
 Eugenio Lobo - Álvaro

Production
The production of the film was somewhat of a family affair, with Arturo Ripstein directing, his wife Paz Alicia Garciadiego writing the screenplay, and their son Gabriel Ripstein making his debut as producer.

Awards
The film was Mexico's official Best Foreign Language Film submission at the 72nd Academy Awards, but did not manage to receive a nomination. It was also entered into the 1999 Cannes Film Festival.

References

External links

1999 films
Mexican drama films
1990s Spanish-language films
Films based on short fiction
Films directed by Arturo Ripstein
Films scored by David Mansfield
1999 drama films
Films based on works by Gabriel García Márquez
1990s Mexican films